The 1967 San Diego mayoral election was held on November 7, 1967 to elect the mayor for San Diego. Incumbent Mayor Frank Curran stood for reelection to a second term. In the primary election, Curran and Allen Hitch received the most votes and advanced to the runoff. Curran was then reelected mayor with a majority of the votes.

Candidates
Frank Curran, Mayor of San Diego 
Allen Hitch, former member of the San Diego City Council and 1963 mayoral candidate
John Clayton
Gerard A. Dougherty
George Stahlman
Lloyd W. Gough
Tom Kane

Campaign
Incumbent Mayor Frank Curran stood for reelection to a second term. On September 19, 1963, Curran came in first in the primary election with 47.2 percent of the vote, followed by former City Councilmember Allen Hitch in second with 32.5 percent. Because no candidate received a majority of the vote, a runoff election was held between Curran and Hitch. On November 7, 1967, Curran easily defeated Hitch a majority of 67.2 percent of the vote in the runoff and was reelected to the office of the mayor.

Primary Election results

General Election results

References

1967
1967 California elections
1967 United States mayoral elections
1960s in San Diego
November 1967 events in the United States